A number of vessels of the People's Liberation Army Navy have borne the name Taizhou, after the capital Taizhou.

 , a Type 053H1 frigate. In service from 1982 until 2019. Renamed from Ningbo in 2003.
 , a Type 956EM destroyer, in service since 2005.

References 

People's Liberation Army Navy ship names